USCGC Robert Yered (WPC-1104) is a  cutter based in Miami, Florida.  She was launched on November 23, 2012, and was commissioned on February 15, 2012. Debbie Wasserman Schultz, the Congressional Representative for the district containing the vessel's base, met the ship when she arrived in Miami on January 27, 2013.

Design
Like her sister ships, she is equipped for coastal security patrols, interdiction of drug and people smugglers, and search and rescue.
Like the smaller  she is equipped with a stern launching ramp.
The ramp allows the deployment and retrieval of her high speed water-jet powered pursuit boat without first coming to a stop.

Operational career

On March 6, 2014, Robert Yered responded to a distress call from the ocean-going tug Patriarch, when containers on a large barge it was pushing burst into flame.

On April 28, 2018, Robert Yered, and another nearby vessel, rescued the five crewmembers of the fishing vessel La Bella.

The owners of the  pleasurecraft Family Time reported a fire had been triggered in their engine room, at 3:20pm, December 7, 2018. They abandoned ship. Robert Yered was nearby, and was able to rescue all three survivors mere minutes after the distress call was placed.

On 20 May 2019, Robert Yered detected an overloaded 30-foot panga vessel and launched a smallboat crew to investigate. The smallboat crew then boarded the vessel and discovered 50 Haitian migrants, including 36 Haitian males and 14 Haitian females. Robert Yered crew safely embarked the migrants and then sank the unsafe vessel to prevent a hazard to navigation. The 50 migrants were then transferred to USCGC Vigilant (WMEC-617), which subsequently repatriated the migrants back to Haiti.

Namesake

She is named after Engineman First Class Robert J. Yered of the U.S. Coast Guard, who put out a fire on an ammunition barge while assigned with a U.S. Coast Guard Explosive Loading Detachment at Cat Lai, South Vietnam during the Vietnam War. Yered was awarded a Silver Star by the U.S. Army for his heroism.

Notes

Citations

Sources

External links

Sentinel-class cutters
Ships of the United States Coast Guard
2012 ships
Ships built in Lockport, Louisiana